Gazoryctra chishimana is a moth of the family Hepialidae. It is known from the Kuril Islands and Japan.

References

Moths described in 1931
Hepialidae
Moths of Asia